WIBK is a country music-formatted broadcast radio station licensed to Watseka, Illinois, serving Watseka and Eastern Iroquois County, Illinois and Western Benton and Southern Newton counties in Indiana. WIBK is a daytime only station and is owned and operated by Iroquois County Broadcasting Company, which is owned by Richard and Margaret Martin. The WIBK antenna is a three-tower array.

WIBK is an AM radio station broadcasting on the regional frequency of 1360 kHz.  The original call letters were WGFA.

An FM translator at 96.9 MHz extends the coverage of the station.  The signal of the FM translator in non-directional.

WIBK is a member of the National Association of Farm Broadcasters.

Programming
WIBK changed format, from Talk radio to country music, on August 25, 2017.

Signal
WIBK's signal is beamed towards the southeast to protect the signal of WLBK in Dekalb, Illinois. WIBK uses a three-tower antenna array.

Previous logos

Translator
In addition to the main station, WIBK is relayed by an FM translator to widen its broadcast area and to provide nighttime coverage.  Translator W245CV is owned by Watseka, Illinois-based Iroguois County Broadcasting Company.

References

External links
 WIBK 1360 AM Online

 Radio Locator Information for W245CV

IBK
Radio stations established in 1961
1961 establishments in Illinois
IBK